Wilton is a historic home located at Wye Mills, Queen Anne's County, Maryland.  It consists of the original brick structure, built between 1749 and 1770, which is a three-bay, -story block, approximately 22 feet by 26 feet. About 1800 a major Flemish bond brick addition was made to the house.

It was listed on the National Register of Historic Places in 1977.

References

External links
, including undated photo, at Maryland Historical Trust

Houses on the National Register of Historic Places in Maryland
Houses in Queen Anne's County, Maryland
Houses completed in 1770
National Register of Historic Places in Queen Anne's County, Maryland
1770 establishments in Maryland